Carlo Peretti (March 5, 1930 – June 1, 2018) was an Italian water polo player who competed in the 1952 Summer Olympics. He was born in Florence. In 1952 he was part of the Italian team which won the bronze medal in the Olympic tournament. He played five matches.

See also
 List of Olympic medalists in water polo (men)

References
Carlo Peretti's obituary

External links
 
 

1930 births
2018 deaths
Sportspeople from Florence
Italian male water polo players
Water polo players at the 1952 Summer Olympics
Olympic bronze medalists for Italy in water polo
Medalists at the 1952 Summer Olympics